Bass & Drums is a collaborative album by Bill Laswell, Tatsuya Nakamura and Hideo Yamaki. It released on March 2, 2011 by P-Vine Records.

Track listing

Personnel 
Adapted from the Bass & Drums liner notes.
Musicians
Bill Laswell – bass guitar, producer
Tatsuya Nakamura – drums (1, 3)
Hideo Yamaki – drums (2, 3)
Technical personnel
Masahide Ando – recording
John Brown – design
James Dellatacoma – mixing
Michael Fossenkemper – mastering
Robert Musso – mixing
Hisaaki Oshima – engineering

Release history

References

External links 
 Bass & Drums at Discogs (list of releases)

2011 live albums
Collaborative albums
Bill Laswell live albums
Tatsuya Nakamura albums
P-Vine Records albums
Albums produced by Bill Laswell